Administrative Professionals' Day
Arbor Day
Armed Forces Day
Bird Day
Children's Day
Constitution Day
Discovery Day 
Dominion Day 
Emancipation Day
Engineer's Day
Father's Day 
Flag Day 
Food Day
Freedom Day
Friendship Day 
Foundation Day
Heritage Day
Heroes' Day
Honesty Day 
Independence Day
Indian Arrival Day
Inventor's Day 
Labour Day
Liberation Day
Maritime Day
Martyrs' Day
Mother's Day
Movable feast
National Day
National Grandparents Day
National Planner Day
National Sports Day
Navy Day
New Year's Day
Parents' Day
Public holiday
Queen's Official Birthday
Ratification Day
Remembrance Day
Republic Day
Revolution Day
Spring break
Spring Day 
Teachers' Day
Thanksgiving 
Unification Day
Unity Day
Victory Day
Youth Day

Generic